A numeronym is a number-based word. Most commonly, a numeronym is a word where a number is used to form an abbreviation (albeit not an acronym or an initialism). Pronouncing the letters and numbers may sound similar to the full word, as in "K9" (pronounced "kay-nine") for "canine, relating to dogs". Alternatively, letters between the first and last letters of a word may be replaced by a number representing the number of letters omitted, such as in "i18n" for "internationalization" where "18" stands in for the word's middle eighteen letters ("nternationalizatio"). Sometimes the last letter is also counted and omitted.  These word shortenings are sometimes called alphanumeric acronyms, alphanumeric abbreviations, or numerical contractions. According to Tex Texin, the first numeronym of this kind was "S12n", the electronic mail account name given to Digital Equipment Corporation (DEC) employee Jan Scherpenhuizen by a system administrator because his surname was too long to be an account name. By 1985, colleagues who found Jan's name unpronounceable often referred to him verbally as "S12n" (ess-twelve-en). The use of such numeronyms became part of DEC corporate culture.

A number may also denote how many times the character before or after it is repeated. This is typically used to represent a name or phrase in which several consecutive words start with the same letter, as in W3 (World Wide Web) or W3C (World Wide Web Consortium). Some numeronyms are composed entirely of numbers, such as "212" for "New Yorker", "4-1-1" for "information", "9-1-1" for "help", "101" for "basic introduction to a subject", and "420" for "Cannabis". Words of this type have existed for decades, including those in 10-code, which has been in use since before World War II. Chapter or title numbers of some jurisdictions' statutes have become numeronyms, for example 5150 and 187 from California's penal code. Largely because the production of many American movies and television programs are based in California, usage of these terms has spread beyond its original location and user population.

Anne H. Soukhanov, editor of the Microsoft Encarta College Dictionary, gives the original meaning of the term as "a telephone number that spells a word or a name" on a telephone dial/numpad.

Examples 
Where words have multiple meanings, abbreviations such as these are almost always used to refer to their computing sense; for example, G11n for "globalization" refers to software preparedness for global distribution, and not the social trend of globalization. In some cases, the use of appropriate case makes it easier to distinguish between letters such as uppercase "I" (eye) and lowercase "l" (el).
 143 – I love you
 187 – slang for "murder", based on section 187 of the California Penal Code.
 520 – I love you (one of many numeronyms used in Chinese Internet Slang)
 8′46″ – The length of time associated with the murder of George Floyd (May 25, 2020 in Minneapolis).
 E15 – The Eyjafjallajökull volcano in Iceland
 g11n – globalisation / globalization
 i14y – interoperability
 a11y – accessibility
 m12n – modularisation / modularization
p13n – personalization
s5n – shorten
h7k – hyperlink
l10n – localisation
i18n – internationalization
a16z – Andreessen Horowitz
64 – Tiananmen Square protests of 1989
K8s – Kubernetes
sk8r – Skater
o11y – Observability
c12s – Communications
c14n – Canonicalization

See also 
 :Category:Letter-number combination disambiguation pages
 Leet-speak
 Phoneword, the use of words to represent telephone numbers
 Nominal number
 -onym

References 

Numbers
Abbreviations